Alphabeat is the debut studio album by Danish band Alphabeat. It was first released in Denmark on 5 March 2007 by Copenhagen Records, and eventually in the rest of Europe in 2008 under the title This Is Alphabeat by the revived Charisma Records.

In June 2018, This is Alphabeat was re-released exclusively on vinyl, in celebration of the album's 10th anniversary.

Singles
"Fantastic 6" was released as a limited-edition 10-inch vinyl in the United Kingdom only, prior to the release of "Fascination". The video for "Fantastic 6" did not surface in the UK, but was released in Denmark—even though the single was not released there.

"Fascination" was released as the album's second single. It charted at number four on the Danish Singles Chart, number six on the UK Singles Chart and number seven on the UK Official Download Chart.

"10.000 Nights of Thunder", the third single, charted at number 16 in Denmark and the UK, as well as number 24 in the Netherlands.

The album's fourth single, "Boyfriend", reached number 11 in Denmark, number 15 in the UK, number 18 in the Netherlands and number 49 in Ireland.

"Go-Go" was released the fifth single from the album. It was only released in Denmark, where peaking at number fourteen.

The album's sixth and final single, "What Is Happening", was only released in the UK and peaked at number 110, becoming their lowest-charting single there.

Critical reception

Alphabeat received generally positive reviews from music critics. At Metacritic, which assigns a normalised rating out of 100 to reviews from mainstream publications, the album received an average score of 72, based on seven reviews.

Track listing
All tracks written by Alphabeat, except where noted.

Notes
  signifies an additional producer
  signifies a remixer
  signifies a main producer and remixer

Personnel

Alphabeat
 Anders B – guitar
 Stine Bramsen – vocals
 Troels Hansen – drums
 Rasmus Nielsen – keyboards
 Anders Reinholdt – bass
 Anders SG – vocals

Additional personnel
Alphabeat
 Ketil Duckert – horns, trumpet 
 Jan Eliasson – mastering
 Morten Jerichau – photography
 Mads Mathias – saxophone 
 Jakob Sørensen – product management
 Spild af Tid ApS – artwork
 Rune Westberg – mixing, recording, production ; recorder ; slide guitar 

This Is Alphabeat

 Alphabeat – production ; additional production 
 Laurence Aldridge – recording assistance 
 Christopher Allan – cello 
 Nell Catchpole – violin 
 Alex Cowper – design
 John Davis – mastering
 Alison Dodds – violin 
 Ketil Duckert – horns, trumpet 
 Richard Edgeler – mixing assistance 
 Finn Eiles – recording ; additional recording 
 Eine – letter art
 Pete Hofmann – additional recording 
 Mads Mathias – saxophone 
 Rachel Robson – viola 
 Mike Spencer – production ; additional production ; mixing 
 Magnus Unnar – photography
 Rune Westberg – mixing ; production, recording ; slide guitar 
 Jeremy Wheatley – mixing

Charts

Weekly charts

Year-end charts

Certifications

Release history

References

2007 debut albums
Alphabeat albums
Charisma Records albums
EMI Records albums
Universal Music Group albums
Universal Music Denmark albums
European Border Breakers Award-winning albums